On the Money is a business and economics news program which aired on CBC News Network from September 12, 2016 to June 28, 2018. The program was developed as a replacement for the network's previous business news program, The Exchange. It was hosted by Peter Armstrong and aired weekdays at 4pm ET/ 1pm PT.

The program was cancelled on June 20, 2018 due to budget constraints at the CBC.

References

2016 Canadian television series debuts
2018 Canadian television series endings
CBC News Network original programming
2010s Canadian television news shows
Business mass media in Canada